John Jacob Clayton (born January 5, 1935) is an American fiction writer, teacher, and editor.  He has published four novels including Mitzvah Man (Texas Tech University Press), and Kuperman's Fire (Permanent Press), as well as five collections of short fiction including Minyan: Ten Interwoven Stories (Paragon House) and Many Seconds into the Future (Texas Tech University Press). He was editor for the Heath Introduction to Fiction, a college anthology published in six editions from 1977 to 1999.

Life
Clayton was born and raised in Manhattan, the only child of Jewish parents Charles Clayton, born Charles Cohen, and Leah Kaufman. His father, born in Montreal, was the son of immigrants from Odessa, who settled in Chicago. His mother, born as Leibe Barlok in Orhei, Bessarabia, immigrated to the U.S. in 1906, and her family settled in Rochester, New York. Clayton graduated from Columbia University with a B.A., New York University with an M.A. and Indiana University with a PhD.  His doctoral thesis Saul Bellow: In Defense of Man, published by University of Indiana Press in 1968 was one of the first books of criticism of Bellow's work.  In the early 1960s Clayton taught at the University of Victoria, British Columbia, then in Germany for the University of Maryland in Europe. From 1964-1969 he lived in Brookline, Massachusetts, and taught at Boston University.  In Fall 1969 he arrived at the University of Massachusetts Amherst, where as professor he taught American and British modern literature and creative writing for over thirty years.

Literature
Clayton's early fiction rendered family life, separation, divorce and childrearing and their attendant tensions, heartbreak and growth. It also dealt with disillusion with political involvement as in his O.Henry prize-winning story "Cambridge is Sinking". Since the early 1990s Clayton's novels and short stories have explored the universal themes of loss and spiritual redemption, acceptance, fading ideals, as well as with contemporary struggles of Jewish life and family.  In 2016 Richard L. Rubenstein wrote of Clayton's collection of linked short stories: "If I were asked whether there is one single book I would recommend to anyone interested in learning about the world of contemporary American Jews, I would unhesitatingly recommend John J. Clayton's Minyan. " Of the novel Kuperman's Fire Thane Rosenbaum wrote: "Clayton is a masterful observer of the modern world, with all its fears and neuroses—the threats that plague us from afar and from within, and the corruptions that contaminate not only our institutions, but also our spirits."

Clayton's fiction, literary criticism, memoir and journalism have appeared in a wide range of literary and popular magazines and newspapers including: Virginia Quarterly Review, AGNI (magazine), The Sewanee Review, The Georgia Review,  TriQuarterly, The Missouri Review, Michigan Quarterly Review, Denver Quarterly, The Antioch Review, Fiction (magazine), Witness (magazine), Playboy, Chronicle of Higher Education and The Washington Post magazine. Beginning in 2003 Commentary magazine has published over twenty of Clayton's stories and memoir pieces

Personal life
Clayton married in 1956 and had two children, Laura and Josh Clayton-Felt (1967-2000), a singer-songwriter who performed lead vocals and guitar for School of Fish. Clayton had two subsequent marriages, and two more sons.  Clayton was diagnosed with Parkinson's disease in 2016.

Works
Novels
 Mitzvah Man Texas Tech University Press, 2011.
 Kuperman's Fire Permanent Press, 2007; Blackstone Audio, 2007. 
 The Man I Never Wanted to Be  Permanent Press, 1998.
 What Are Friends For? Little, Brown and Company, Boston, 1979.

Short story collections
 Minyan: Ten Interwoven Stories Paragon House, 2016.
 Many Seconds into the Future Texas Tech University Press, 2014.
 Wrestling with Angels: New and Collected Stories Toby Press, subsidiary of Koren Publishers Jerusalem, September 2007, and Amazon Publishing, 2011.
 Radiance: Ten Stories Ohio State University Press, 1998. 
 Bodies of the Rich University of Illinois Press, 1984.

Criticism and anthology
 Gestures of Healing: Anxiety and the Modern Novel University of Massachusetts Press, 1991.
 Saul Bellow: In Defense of Man University of Indiana Press, 1968; Second edition, revised, 1979. 
 Heath Introduction to Fiction D. C. Heath and Company, Six editions 1977-1999.

Non-fiction
 Parkinson's Blues: Stories of My Life Paragon House, 2020

References

External links
 Author's website
 Author Archive at Commentary Magazine
 Author Archive at AGNI online
 Interview with John Clayton by Bill Roorbach, 2011
 Writer's Voice in-depth author conversation with Francesca Rheannon on collected stories Wrestling with Angels, 2007

20th-century American novelists
Writers from New York City
Living people
Novelists from New York (state)
1935 births
Columbia College (New York) alumni
New York University alumni
Indiana University alumni
American people of Jewish descent
Jewish writers